Hygrocybe flavifolia is a mushroom of the waxcap genus Hygrocybe. Found in North America, it was described as new to science by Alexander H. Smith and Lexemuel Ray Hesler in 1942 as a species of Hygrophorus. Rolf Singer transferred it to Hygrocybe in 1945.

See also

List of Hygrocybe species
List of fungi by conservation status

References

External links

Fungi of North America
flavifolia
Fungi described in 1942